Adenanthos apiculatus is a shrub of the family Proteaceae, native to the south coast of Western Australia.  Within the genus Adenanthos, it lies in the section Adenanthos and has had only 29 records of occurrence.

References

apiculatus
Eudicots of Western Australia
Garden plants of Australia